The funghellino (Italian for "small mushroom") is a short mushroom-shaped stand used in the Roman Catholic liturgy. It is placed on the altar at a Pontifical Mass to hold the bishop's and higher prelates' skullcap (zuchetto) during the Eucharistic prayer.

Eucharistic objects
Catholic liturgy